Takuyo-Daini is a seamount in the Pacific Ocean.

Takuyo-Daini is part of the so-called "Seiko" cluster or the "Geisha Guyots" in the Japanese Seamounts; it lies just west of Takuyo-Daisan seamount with which it forms a pair. Both seamounts are guyots and together with two other guyots known as Winterer and Isakov have been interpreted as being part of a hotspot track.

The Western Pacific Ocean contains a large number of seamounts which often from clusters or groups. A number of these formed during a large-scale volcanic episode in the Albian-Aptian era of the Cretaceous; this includes Takuyo-Daini, where radiometric dating has yielded ages of 118.6 million years ago. At the time of its formation this seamount was located in the central Pacific Ocean. Fossils of rudist bivalves have been found on Takuyo-Daini; the seamount once featured rudist reefs that ceased growing during the Albian. The rudist genera Magallanesia was discovered on Takuyo-Daini and on Cebu in the Philippines.

References

Sources 

 

Seamounts of the Pacific Ocean
Cretaceous volcanoes
Geography of Japan